Benjamin Broadbent may refer to:

 Ben Broadbent (born 1965), British economist
 Benjamin Broadbent (builder) (1813–1862), English master builder, stonemason and architect